Audrey Schuh (born June 11, 1931) is an American operatic soprano. She studied at Loyola University of the South.

Schuh was born in New Orleans, Louisiana. Her first leading role with the New Orleans Opera Association (at the age of eighteen) was the page-boy Oscar in Un ballo in maschera, opposite Jussi Björling, in 1950. She starred there in Don Giovanni (as Zerlina), Carmen (as Micaëla), Amelia al ballo, Falstaff (as Nannetta), Die Fledermaus (as Roselinde von Eisenstein), Hänsel und Gretel (as Gretel), La bohème (as Musetta), La traviata, La bohème (as Mimì), Markheim (world premiere), Turandot (as Liù), Elektra (as Chrysothemis), Pagliacci, and Il tabarro.

Schuh also sang Nannetta in Falstaff for the San Francisco Opera.  She sang with the Houston Grand Opera (Madama Butterfly), the New England Opera Theatre (La traviata and La rondine), the Jackson Opera Guild (Pagliacci, then Die Fledermaus with Virginia MacWatters) and the San Antonio Opera Guild (Markheim).  In 1967, she appeared at the New York City Opera for a memorable season at its new theatre at Lincoln Center:  La bohème (as Mimì), Madama Butterfly (directed by Frank Corsaro), and Suor Angelica (conducted by Julius Rudel). She made a return to the New Orleans Opera in 1977, again as Micaëla, which was her Farewell.

One of her sons, the tenor Kirk Redmann, appeared with the Metropolitan Opera from 1983-90. From 1994 to 1999, VAI issued several of Schuh's New Orleans performances on Compact Discs.

Discography
 Verdi: Un ballo in maschera (S.Morris, Björling, Rothmüller; Herbert, 1950) [live] VAI
 Verdi: Falstaff (della Chiesa, Warren; Cellini, 1956) [live] VAI
 Puccini: La bohème (Albanese, di Stefano, Valdengo, Treigle; Cellini, 1959) [live] VAI
 Floyd: Markheim (Treigle; Andersson, 1966) [live] VAI
 Puccini: Turandot: excerpts (Nilsson; Andersson, 1966) [live] VAI
 Strauss: Elektra (Borkh, Resnik, Crofoot, Rayson; Andersson, 1966) [live] VAI

References
 The New York City Opera: An American Adventure, by Martin L. Sokol (Annals by George Louis Mayer), Macmillan Publishing Co, Inc, 1981. 
 "Audrey Schuh: A Golden Tribute," by Brian Morgan, New Orleans Opera Association 2000-01 program booklet.
 "New Orleans' Longtime Promotion of the Vocal Arts, A Prime Case: The Career of soprano Audrey Schuh," by Dan Shea, "Journal of the Jussi Björling Society," February 2019.

External links
  Audrey Schuh in an excerpt from Un ballo in maschera (1950).

1931 births
Living people
American operatic sopranos
Musicians from New Orleans
Loyola University New Orleans alumni
Singers from Louisiana
20th-century American women opera singers
21st-century American women